Florida is an unincorporated community in La Plata County, in the U.S. state of Colorado.

History
A post office called Florida was established in 1877, and remained in operation until 1881. The community takes its name from the nearby Florida River.

References

Unincorporated communities in La Plata County, Colorado
Unincorporated communities in Colorado